Great Bridge is a village in the Metropolitan Borough of Sandwell. It is situated in Tipton, near the border of West Bromwich, and it is within the metropolitan county of the West Midlands.

Origins and history
The place name, Great Bridge comes from Old English 'grēot' (grit or gravelly - meaning a stream with a gravelly bed), with the later addition of 'Bridge' - when a bridge was first built over the stream. There are several watercourses in England with the name 'Greet', all from this origin. The stream is thought to be the Oldbury arm of the River Tame, known to the early English in this area as 'grēot' (Greets Green also gets its name from the watercourse).

For most of the 20th century Great Bridge was the home of numerous factories (including an ice cream factory opened by Italian immigrant Giuseppe Bonaccorsi) and foundries. However, by the end of the 1990s most of the factories had long since been closed and been demolished. These include Ratcliff's on Eagle Lane, which closed in 1989, and John Thompson's on Horseley Road, which closed in 1991.

It has been home to a historic market place for several centuries. It boasts 2 markets, a recently relocated purpose-built outdoor market managed by the local council, as well as an indoor market which is in poor condition. It was opened by the performer Larry Grayson.

Modern day
Many new housing developments have sprung up in Great Bridge since the early 1990s, mostly on the sites of old factories.

A 24-hour two-storey Asda superstore opened in May 1998. The surrounding shopping area is notable for the large number of fast food restaurants including McDonald's, KFC (both of which sprung up in the mid-1990s), numerous fish and chip shops and curry houses, along with numerous off-licences along the high street.

A smaller supermarket in the old village was opened in December 1986 and occupied by Kwik Save until the retailer went into liquidation in 2007. Wilko took the building over in May 2008.  In recent years, Lidl and B & M have opened branches in the town.

Recreation
The Sheepwash Urban Park (now Sheepwash Nature Reserve) lies within the Great Bridge Area. It is a local beauty spot where fishing can be carried out and wild birds such as herons, ducks, swans and Canada geese can be seen. It is encircled by a path which both walkers and cyclists  use.

World War II bombings
In the early hours of 17 May 1941, an air raid by the German Luftwaffe destroyed the Tipton Tavern house on the corner of New Road and Horseley Road, killing six people; two brothers aged three and seven years, a 36-year-old male air raid warden, a middle aged married couple and a 42-year-old woman.

New Road Methodist Church was also destroyed in the same attack and a number of nearby houses were damaged.

Transport
There were two railway stations (Great Bridge North railway station and Great Bridge South railway station) in the Great Bridge area, but both stations were closed in the 1960s due to the Beeching Axe. Great Bridge South Station was situated on the line between Great Bridge and West Bromwich, which was dismantled during the 1970s. Great Bridge North Station was situated on the South Staffordshire Line between Walsall and Stourbridge, which closed to passengers in the 1960s but remained open for goods trains until the Walsall - Round Oak section was closed in 1993. It is set to re-open during the 2020s as an extension to the Midland Metro.

The main island in the centre of Great Bridge is decorated with two lions that came from the old showroom of Roman mosaic that was located on the nearby Burnt Tree Island.

Great Bridge already has direct bus links with Tipton, Dudley, and West Bromwich (via the 74 number bus that runs from Dudley and onto Birmingham) and also has direct bus links to Wednesbury.

Since 1995, Great Bridge has been served by the Black Country Spine Road which gives a quick dual carriageway route to Bilston and Wednesbury in one direction and West Bromwich as well as the M5 motorway in the other. This opened up several square miles of previously inaccessible land for industrial and commercial use, bringing jobs to Great Bridge in the aftermath of the 1970s and 1980s de-industrialisation.

The Walsall Canal and River Thame both pass through the eastern side of the town. A pedestrian footpath crossing them links the town centre to the Asda site.

See also
Sandwell
West Midlands

References

Areas of Sandwell
Tipton